Charles O'Brien may refer to:
Charles O'Brien, 5th Viscount Clare (1673–1706)
Charles O'Brien, 6th Viscount Clare (1699–1761), Irish military officer in French service
Charles O'Brien, 7th Viscount Clare (1757–1774)
Charles O'Brien (colonial administrator) (1859–1935), British Governor of the Seychelles (1912–1918) and Barbados (1918–1925)
Charles O'Brien (cricketer) (1921–1980), Australian cricketer
Charles F. X. O'Brien (1879–1940), United States Representative from New Jersey
Charles H. O'Brien (1920–2007), State Senator and judge from Tennessee, United States
Charles M. O'Brien (1875–1952), Member of the Legislative Assembly of Alberta, Canada (1909–1913)
Charles P. O'Brien (born 1939), American research scientist
Charlie O'Brien (born 1960), retired American baseball player
Charlie O'Brien (racing driver) (born 1955), Australian racing driver

See also
Charles Bryan (disambiguation)